Deansgate Square, formerly known as Owen Street, is a skyscraper cluster on the southern edge of Manchester City Centre, consisting of four towers, the tallest of which is . The site is just south of Deansgate railway station and north of the Mancunian Way, bounded by Deansgate, Owen Street and the River Medlock. The towers sit at different angles to each other, with a slight bevel, or 'cut back', on each side of each building which ensures the towers catch the light at different times of day.

Manchester City Council adopted a framework in the early 2000s, known as the Great Jackson Street Development Framework, which earmarked the site as an acceptable location for high-rise buildings. The framework was enacted to encourage building development, as the site had been vacant for many years and was perceived to be isolated as it was bounded by major arterial roads.

The South Tower surpassed the  Beetham Tower as the tallest building in Greater Manchester in November 2018. 

Overall completion of the development occurred in late 2020. As of February 2023, additional towers are under construction in the adjacent vicinity as part of the Great Jackson Street Development Framework, including the  Elizabeth Tower which was completed in 2021.

History

2007 original scheme
The 2007 scheme consisted of five high-rise buildings containing nearly 1,100 residential units, 100 serviced apartments, a hotel, parking, office and retail space, and community facilities.

A planning application was submitted to Manchester City Council in 2007 and was approved early in 2008. Permission to extend the time limit for building on the site was sought from the Council in early 2011, a request which was granted in September 2011.

2016 revived scheme
The revised scheme, proposed by developers Renaker Build and designed by SimpsonHaugh and Partners, was made public in January 2016 with a planning application to seek permission for the construction of four skyscrapers submitted in April.

The proposed towers range from 122 to 200+ metres high – the South Tower is 64 floors and 200.5 metres tall, the East Tower is 50 floors and 157.9 metres tall, the North Tower is 37 floors and 122 metres tall and the West Tower is 44 floors and 140.4 metres tall.

The scheme was approved by Manchester City Council on 30 June 2016.

Construction
Construction on the tower complex officially began in July 2016, with developer Renaker starting construction on the South and West Towers. Piling works on the West Tower were complete by November 2016, with tower cranes erected soon after. Both towers would continue to rise for another two years before "topping out" in mid-2018.

By October 2017, as both the South and West Towers continued to rise, construction on the foundation and podium for the North and East Towers commenced. By July 2018, the West Tower topped out, having reached the 45th floor - its highest floor level. By November 2018, the South Tower – the tallest tower of the approved scheme at 201 metres – had topped out, having reached the 65th floor, its highest floor level.

In August 2018, institutional investor Legal & General acquired the West Tower with the intention to rent the tower out once complete. Although this deal for the West tower was undisclosed, its estimated real estate value was believed to be in the region of £200 million, according to Estates Gazette.

In January 2020, Legal & General announced the exchange of contracts for the Built to Rent North Tower. The North Tower represents Legal & General's second Built to Rent acquisition in Deansgate Square.

October 2020 saw the final completion of the North, South, East and West Towers.

See also
 Beetham Tower – the former tallest completed building in Manchester at 169 metres. South Tower at 201 metres became the tallest building in Greater Manchester and outside London in the United Kingdom.
 List of tallest buildings in the United Kingdom – as of February 2023, the cluster of four towers are the 11th, 33rd, 53rd and joint 83rd tallest in the United Kingdom.
List of tallest buildings and structures in Greater Manchester

References

External links

 Deansgate Square at Renaker Build
 Owen Street at SimpsonHaugh and Partners
  1, 2 and 3 bedroom apartments for rent with exceptional services, owned by Legal & General

Proposed buildings and structures in Manchester
Skyscrapers in Manchester